Sulzberg is a mountain of Bavaria, Germany.

IMS station 
Two of the German IMS (International Monitoring System) measuring stations for monitoring a nuclear test ban treaty are located on Sulzberg. The primary seismic station GERES (PS19) consists of 25 seismometers installed in a radius of two kilometers. The five measuring points of the 26DE (IS26) detect infrasound. The favorable geological conditions led to the local construction of the measuring points.

References 

Mountains of Bavaria
Bohemian Forest
Mountains of the Bavarian Forest